This is a list of commercial banks in Mozambique
 Access Bank Mozambique S.A.
 Absa Bank Mozambique
 Banco Comercial e de Investimentos (BCI)
 Banco de Investimentos Global (BIG)
 Banco Mercantil e de Investimentos (BMI)
 Banco MAIS
 Banco Moza
 Banco Nacional de Investimentos (BNI)
 Banco Société Générale Moçambique (SGM)
 Banco Terra (BTM)
 Ecobank Mozambique
 First National Bank Mozambique
 First Capital Bank Mozambique (FCB)
 Letshego Bank Mozambique
 Millennium BIM (BIM)
 Nedbank Mozambique (NBM)
 Opportunity Bank Mozambique (OBM)
 Socremo Microfinance Bank
 Standard Bank
 United Bank for Africa

See also
 List of banks in Africa
 Bank of Mozambique
 Economy of Mozambique
 List of companies based in Mozambique

References

External links
 Website of Bank of Mozambique (Portuguese)

 
Banks
Mozambique
Mozambique